Nam Giang is a district (huyện) of Quảng Nam province in the South Central Coast region of Vietnam. As of 2003 the district had a population of 19,570. The district capital lies at Thạnh Mỹ.

References

Districts of Quảng Nam province